MNW or mnw may refer to:
MNW Music, a Swedish record company
MNW, an Indian English Movie channel
ISO 639-3 code for modern Mon language

MNW is an abbreviation of:
MNW, Muzeum Narodowe w Warszawie 
Manson–Northwest Webster Community School District